David Laurin Ricken (born November 9, 1952) is an American prelate of the Roman Catholic Church, serving as the bishop of the Diocese of Green Bay in Wisconsin since 2008. Ricken previously served as bishop of the Diocese of Cheyenne in Wyoming from 1999 to 2008.

Biography

Early life and education

David Ricken was born on November 9, 1952, to George William "Bill" Ricken and Bertha (Davis) Ricken  in Dodge City, Kansas. He has two siblings: a brother Mark and a sister Carol, who became principal of St. Mary’s School in Cheyenne, Wyoming. For his primary education, David Ricken attended Sacred Heart Cathedral Grade School in Dodge City. He later attended St. Francis High School Seminary in Victoria, Kansas, graduating in 1970.

Ricken studied philosophy at the Pontifical College Josephinum in Worthington, Ohio, and Conception Seminary College in Conception, Missouri, graduating there in 1974. As a seminarian for the Diocese of Pueblo, he attended St. Meinrad School of Theology in St. Meinrad, Indiana, and the American College of the Immaculate Conception in Leuven, Belgium.  Ricken obtained a Master of Theology degree in 1980 from the Catholic University of Leuven.

Ordination and ministry

Ricken was ordained to the priesthood by Bishop Arthur Tafoya on September 12, 1980 for the Diocese of Pueblo. After his ordination, Ricken served as associate pastor of the Cathedral of the Sacred Heart Parish in Pueblo until 1985. From 1985 to 1987, he was both parish administrator of Holy Rosary Parish and vice-chancellor of the diocese. In 1987, Ricken went to the Pontifical Gregorian University in Rome, where he earned a Licentiate of Canon Law in 1989.

After returning to Colorado, Ricken was named diocesan vocation director and Vicar for ministry formation, and became diocesan chancellor in 1992. In 1996. Ricken returned to Rome to work as an official of the Congregation for the Clergy in the Roman Curia, serving in that position until 1999.

Bishop of Cheyenne

On December 14, 1999, Ricken was appointed as coadjutor bishop of the Diocese of Cheyenne by Pope John Paul II. He received his episcopal consecration on January 6, 2000, in Rome from John Paul II, with Archbishop Giovanni Re and Marcello Zago,  serving as co-consecrators, in St. Peter's Basilica. Ricken succeeded Bishop Joseph Hart as bishop of Cheyenne on September 26, 2001, upon the latter's retirement.

Ricken is a 2009 inductee in the Catholic Education Foundation's Hall of Fame. While the bishop of Cheyenne, he co-founded Wyoming Catholic College in Lander, Wyoming, established the Wyoming School of Catholic Thought at Wyoming Catholic College, and founded the John Paul II Catholic School in Gillette, Wyoming. Ricken oversaw the building of a new building for St. Mary's Catholic School in Cheyenne.

Bishop of Green Bay
Pope Benedict XVI named Ricken as the twelfth bishop of the Diocese of Green Bay on July 9, 2008. Ricken was installed on August 28, 2008. In August 2019, Ricken came under scrutiny for a letter he wrote in 2002 about Bishop Hart. In 2002, a Wyoming man filed a complaint with the Cheyenne Police Department that Hart had molested him when he was age 14 in the 1970's.  Ricken, then bishop of Cheyenne, wrote a letter to the police that vouched for Hart's innocence.  After a police investigation over several months, the district attorney declined to prosecute Hart.

In 2017, Cheyenne Bishop Steven Biegler initiated a diocesan investigation of the Hart case, which ultimately found the allegations against Hart to be credible.  This investigation also revealed more possible victims of Hart. When asked in 2019 about Hart, Ricken replied: "Well I suppose reading back you could say that, but I did what I knew to do at the time with what I knew, and that’s what I did."

See also

 Catholic Church hierarchy
 Catholic Church in the United States
 Historical list of the Catholic bishops of the United States
 List of Catholic bishops of the United States
 Lists of patriarchs, archbishops, and bishops

References

External links

Roman Catholic Diocese of Green Bay
Roman Catholic Diocese of Cheyenne 

1952 births
Living people
21st-century Roman Catholic bishops in the United States
American College of the Immaculate Conception alumni
KU Leuven alumni
People from Dodge City, Kansas
Pontifical College Josephinum alumni
Pontifical Gregorian University alumni
Roman Catholic bishops of Cheyenne
Roman Catholic bishops of Green Bay
Catholics from Kansas